Chitoria subcaerulea is a species of nymphalid butterfly endemic to China (Omei-Shan).

References

Apaturinae
Butterflies described in 1891
Butterflies of Asia